Cool for Cats is the second studio album by the English new wave group Squeeze, released in 1979. Cool for Cats contains four UK hit singles, more than any other album the band has issued. The album peaked at number 45 in the UK Albums Chart, spending 11 weeks in that listing.

Its 1997 CD release, as part of the Six of One... box set contained two bonus tracks. This collection included the band's first six studio albums, each digitally remastered. In 1998 the six CDs were released individually. In 2007, the album was digitally remastered and released with 5 bonus tracks exclusively in Japan. Each of the 5 tracks came from B-sides from the singles released from the album.

Content
Billboard said Cool for Cats was a "hard-rocking" album with "hard-edged power pop". Alluding to the record, Steven Thomas Erlewine of AllMusic described Cool for Cats as "the work of a rock & roll band [...] that lathered on the keyboards and herky-jerky rhythms".

Critical reception

In 1979, Billboard selected Cool for Cats as one of its "recommended LPs" and cited "Slap and Tickle", "Hop, Skip & Jump", "Up the Junction", and "It's So Dirty" as the album's "best cuts".

Reviewing the album in Christgau's Record Guide: Rock Albums of the Seventies (1981), Robert Christgau wrote: "Power poppers (remember them?) suck this stuff up, and I understand why—not only does its songcraft surpass that of the band's debut, but it also isn't quite as sophomoric. It's sophomoric enough, though, and like so many such records makes you wonder where the power is. Not in the vision, that's for sure. And not in the beat. Great song: 'Up the Junction.'"

In 1995, Chris Woodstra proclaimed Cool for Cats to be a "pure pop masterpiece" in the All Music Guide to Rock.

Track listing
All songs written by Chris Difford and Glenn Tilbrook except "Hop, Skip & Jump", by Difford and Jools Holland.
 "Slap and Tickle" – 4:00
 "Revue" – 2:30
 "Touching Me Touching You" – 2:25
 "It's Not Cricket" – 2:35
 "It's So Dirty" – 3:11
 "The Knack" – 4:34
 "Hop, Skip & Jump" – 2:46
 "Up the Junction" – 3:12
 "Hard to Find" – 3:37
 "Slightly Drunk" – 2:41
 "Goodbye Girl" – 3:08
 "Cool for Cats" – 3:39

Bonus tracks (1997 reissue)
"I Must Go" – 2:16
 "Ain't It Sad" – 3:29

Bonus tracks (2007 Japanese remaster)
(Note: These bonus tracks precede the 1997 bonus tracks on the album.)
 "Saints Alive" – 2:30
 "All's Well" – 2:27
 "Christmas Day" – 3:53
 "Going Crazy" – 3:53
 "Blood and Guts" – 5:01

Personnel
Squeeze
 Glenn Tilbrook – keyboards, lead guitars, vocals
 Jools Holland – keyboards, vocals (7)
 Chris Difford – rhythm guitars, vocals
 Harri Kakoulli – bass
 Gilson Lavis – drums

Production and Technical
 Squeeze – producers, arrangements
 John Wood – producer, arrangements
 Brian Humphries – engineer
 Andrew Lumm – engineer
 Laurence Burrage – assistant engineer
 Michael Ross – art direction
 Geoff Halpin – original sleeve design
 Jeffrey Kent Ayeroff – artwork
 Janette Beckman – photography
 Mark Hanauer – photography
 Chuck Beeson – cover design
 Cindy Marsh – illustrations
 Glenn Tilbrook – digital remastering
 Roger Wake – digital remastering

Charts

Certifications

References

External links
 Album summary

Squeeze (band) albums
1979 albums
A&M Records albums
Albums produced by John Wood (record producer)
Albums recorded at Olympic Sound Studios